The Presbyterian Church in Korea (NamBuk) is a Reformed denomination in South Korea.In 2004 it had 310,000 members and 213 congregation and 250 pastors. The Apostles Creed and the Westminster Confession are the official standards. The church government is Presbyterian.

References 

Presbyterian denominations in South Korea